Miszewo Wielkie  is a village in the administrative district of Gmina Nowe Miasto, within Płońsk County, Masovian Voivodeship, in east-central Poland.

References

Miszewo Wielkie